Puerto Rican cuisine has its roots in the cooking traditions and practices of Europe (mostly Spain), Africa and the native Taínos.

History

Puerto Rican cuisine has been influenced by an array of cultures including Taino Arawak, Spanish, and African. Although Puerto Rican cooking is somewhat similar to both Spanish and other Latin American cuisine, it reflects a unique blend of influences, using indigenous seasonings and ingredients. Locals call their cuisine cocina criolla. By the end of the nineteenth century, the traditional Puerto Rican cuisine was well established. By 1848 the first restaurant, La Mallorquina, opened in Old San Juan.  El Cocinero Puerto-Riqueño o Formulario, the island's first cookbook, was published in 1849.

Taíno influence

See: Native American cuisine

From the diet of the Taíno (culturally related with the Maya and Carib peoples of Central America and the Caribbean) and Arawak people come many tropical roots and tubers (collectively called viandas) like yautía (Xanthosoma) and especially yuca. Viandas are starchy root vegetables, including  yuca, ñame, yautía, batata, malanga, and the Puerto Rican apio, all locally grown in the mountain regions of the Island.

Spanish/European influence

See: Spanish cuisine

 Arroz con dulce – In Puerto Rico rice pudding is made with rice, sugar, coconut milk, milk, clove, cinnamon, ginger, star anise, rum, and raisins. There are other variations that include purees added such as squash, sweet plantains, batata, yuca, and ripe breadfruit. Cream cheese and pistachios are popular and a rice pudding made with additional egg, lemon peel, and cream cooked just like crème brûlée. The first written record known to exist about this dish dates 1859 but historians can trace it as far back as the 16th century.
 Flan – A milk and caramel custard very popular throughout Puerto Rico. There are several ways to make this dish. Some are unique to Puerto Rico, such as breadfruit and sesame seeds. Coconut and pumpkin are two popular varieties.

African influence
See: African cuisine

Coconuts, coffee (brought by the Arabs and Corsos to Yauco from Kafa, Ethiopia), okra, taro (malanga), tamarind, yams (ñame), sesame seeds, gandules (pigeon peas), plantains, many varieties of bananas, other root vegetables and Guinea hen, all came to Puerto Rico from, or at least through, Africa. African slaves also introduced the deep-frying of food, such as cuchifritos.

Regional

Arecibo
Arecibo is the biggest municipality in Puerto Rico by area and is located on the northern coast. In the Río Grande de Arecibo, whitebait called cetí is caught.

Basic ingredients

Seafood and shellfish

On certain coastal towns of the island, such as Luquillo, Fajardo, and Cabo Rojo, seafood is quite popular. 

 Cetí – A type of whitebait found in Arecibo.
 Chillo – Red snapper is a favorite among the locals.

Seasoning blends
Traditional cooking on the island uses more fresh and local ingredients such as citrus to make mojo and mojito isleño and especially fresh herbs, vegetables and peppers to make recaíto and sofrito.

The base of many Puerto Rican main dishes involves sofrito, similar to the mirepoix of French cooking, or the "trinity" of Creole cooking. A proper sofrito is a sauté of freshly ground garlic, tomatoes, onions, recao/culantro, cilantro, red peppers, cachucha and cubanelle peppers. Sofrito is traditionally cooked with olive oil or annatto oil, tocino (bacon), salted pork and cured ham. A mix of stuffed olives and capers called alcaparrado are usually added with spices such as bay leaf, sazón and adobo.

Puerto Rican dishes

Although Puerto Rican diets can vary greatly from day to day, there are some markedly similar patterns to daily meals. Dinners almost invariably include a meat, and rice and beans.

Thanksgiving dishes
Most American dishes have been adopted for this special day. Side dishes such as cornbread, roasted yams, mashed potatoes with gravy, hard apple cider, and cranberry sauce are a part of a Puerto Rican Thanksgiving menu.

 Dulce –  The fusion of American mainland and Puerto Rican food can be clearly seen in Thanksgiving desserts. Puerto Rican desserts use the same traditional ingredients as American holiday desserts including pumpkin, yams, and sweet potatoes. Classic sweets are infused with sweet viandas. Flan de calabasas (squash flan), Tortitas de Calabaza (pumpkin tarts), Cazuela (a pie made with pumpkin, sweet potato, coconut, and sometimes carrots), Barriguitas de Vieja (deep-fried sweet pumpkin fritters made with coconut milk and spices), Cheese cake with tropical fruit, Buñuelos de Calabasas o platáno (pumpkin or sweet plantains doughnuts), and Budín de Pan y calabasas (bread pudding made from squash bread).

Christmas dishes

Puerto Rican culture can be seen and felt all year-round, but it is on its greatest display during Christmas when people celebrate the traditional aguinaldo and parrandas – Puerto Rico's version of carol singing.  Puerto Rican food is a main part of this celebration.

 Pasteles – For many Puerto Rican families, the quintessential holiday season dish is pasteles, a soft dough-like mass wrapped in a banana or plantain leaf and boiled, and in the center chopped meat, shellfish, chicken, raisins, spices, capers, olives, sofrito, and often garbanzo beans. Puerto Rican pasteles are made from either green bananas or starchy tropical roots. The wrapper in a Puerto Rican pastel is a banana leaf.
 Tembleque – Sweets are common in Puerto Rican cuisine. During the holidays, one of the most popular are desserts such as tembleque. This is a coconut-based dessert pudding. It can be made with 2 cans of coconut milk, ¾ cups of sugar, ¼ teaspoon of kosher salt, ½ cup of cornstarch, 1 pinch of ground cinnamon (for garnish), and toasted coconut (for garnish).

Beverages

 Chocolate Caliente – Hot chocolate made with coco, vanilla, milk, spices, small amount of edam cheese, and topped with whipped cream.

Kiosks
Rustic stalls displaying many kinds fritters under heat lamps or behind a glass pane can be spotted in may place in Puerto Rico. Collectively known as frituras in Puerto Rico, these snacks are called cuchifritos in New York City, but to be strictly correct, cuchifritos are the mom-and-pop stores where frituras are sold. In Puerto Rico, the name quiscos (kiosk) is used to refer to the cuchifrito. Quioscos are a much-frequented, time-honored, and integral part to a day at the beach and the culinary culture of the island.  Fresh octopus and conch salad are frequently seen.  Much larger kiosks serve hamburgers, local/Caribbean fusion, Thai, Italian, Mexican and even Peruvian food. This mixing of the new cuisine and the classic Puerto Rican food.  Alcoholic beverage are a big part of kiosks with most kiosks having a signature drink.

 Bacalaítos – Bacalaítos are the codfish fritters from Puerto Rico. They are a staple food at many kiosks.
 Sorullos – The cornmeal equivalent of mozzarella sticks, except that they're rather fatter and shorter. They're often made with cheese.

Puerto Rican food outside Puerto Rico

 Cuchifritos – In New York, cuchifritos are quite popular. Cuchifritos, often known as "Puerto Rican soul food" includes a variety of dishes, including, but not limited to: morcilla (blood sausage), chicharron (fried pork skin), patitas (pork feet),  (fried porkmeat), and various other parts of the pig prepared in different ways.
 Jibarito (Plaintain Sandwich) – In Chicago, El Jibarito is a popular dish. The word jíbaro in Puerto Rico means a man from the countryside, especially a small landowner or humble farmer from far up in the mountains. Typically served with Puerto Rican yellow rice, Jibaritos consist of a meat along with mayonnaise, cheese, lettuce, tomatoes and onions, all sandwiched between a fried plantain, known as a canoa (canoe). In the early 20th century, bread made from wheat (which would have to be imported) was expensive out in the mountain towns of the Cordillera Central, and jíbaros were made from plantains which are still grown there on the steep hillsides. The version introduced to Chicago was originally made with skirt steak, but today it can be found in versions made with chicken, roast pork, ham, shrimp and even the vegetarian option tofu is available.

Chefs
 Alfredo Ayala - was recognized as the father of Puerto Rican modern cuisine
 Doreen Colondres - chef, television presenter, food writer and sommelier
 Luis Antonio Cosme – Puerto Rican actor and television chef
 Giovanna Huyke – television chef
 Dora Romano – author of Cocine Conmigo written in 1972
 Daisy Martinez  – author of Daisy Cooks: Latin Flavors That Will Rock Your World written in 2005 and Daisy: Morning, Noon and Night written in * of Daisy Cooks! on PBS and ¡Viva Daisy! on the food network
 Maria Perez – author of Tropical Cooking Made Easy  written in 2007

Gallery

See also

 Caribbean cuisine
 Coco Lopez
 Cuisine of the United States
 Cultural diversity in Puerto Rico
 History of women in Puerto Rico
 List of Puerto Rican rums
 Piragua
 Puerto Rican Christmas food
 Street food
 Carmen González (chef)

References

External links

 El Boricua - Puerto Rican traditional recipes
 Carmen Santiago, Puerto Rican chef 

 
Latin American cuisine
Caribbean cuisine